Instant Death may refer to:
Instant Death, a band formed by bassist Dave Dreiwitz
Instant Death (album), an album by jazz  saxophonist Eddie Harris
"Instant Death", a song by rap band the Beastie Boys from the album Hello Nasty